Aisha Chughtai (born 1997/1998) is an American community organizer and politician serving on the Minneapolis City Council from the 10th Ward. A member of the DFL, she was elected in 2021 to succeed retiring Council President Lisa Bender. She is the youngest person and first Muslim woman elected to the Council.

Early life and career
Chughtai's parents are immigrants from Pakistan, her father worked as a mechanic and her mother worked as a Quranic instructor. She grew up in Houston where her family experienced housing instability and moved to Mankato, Minnesota during the 2008 financial crisis.

Chughtai has worked on numerous political campaigns including as campaign manager of U.S. Representative Ilhan Omar's 2018 campaign. She later worked as a political organizer for the SEIU Minnesota State Council.

Minneapolis City Council

Chughtai announced her intention to run for retiring Council President Lisa Bender's seat in Ward 10. Her campaign focused on expanding affordable housing and strengthening local labor laws. The DFL did not issue an endorsement in the ward due to no candidate achieving the necessary vote threshold. She was endorsed by the abortion rights organization #VOTEPROCHOICE.

She won the instant-runoff election on November 3 with 50.3% to her nearest challenger's 33.6% according to unofficial results. She took office on January 3, 2022, becoming the first Asian American, Muslim woman, and youngest member of the Council. She took the oath of office on a ceremonial Quran also used by Ilhan Omar, Keith Ellison, Omar Fateh, and numerous other Muslim officials elected in Minneapolis.

She advocates for community control over the police.

Personal life
A renter, Chughtai lives in the Whittier neighborhood of Minneapolis. She is a member of the Twin Cities DSA.

References

21st-century American politicians
21st-century American women politicians
American Muslims
American people of Pakistani descent
American politicians of Pakistani descent
Living people
Democratic Socialists of America politicians from Minnesota
Minneapolis City Council members
Minnesota Democrats
Year of birth missing (living people)
Women city councillors in Minnesota
1990s births